The Jefferson Leader is a local American newspaper founded in 1994 in Festus, Missouri. As part of The Leader Publications, The Jefferson County Leader provides local news for Jefferson County, Missouri and the greater Saint Louis region.

References

1994 establishments in Missouri
Publications established in 1994
Newspapers published in Missouri